The Blaydon byelection of 2 February 1956 was a by-election held in the British House of Commons constituency of Blaydon in County Durham, the North East of England.

It was caused by the death on 3 November 1955 of William Whiteley, the sitting Labour Party Member of Parliament for the constituency, who had first been elected in 1922 and had represented it ever since with the exception of 1931 to 1935. Labour Party candidate Robert Woof held the seat with little change in the majority.

Candidates
Labour selected Robert Woof, who was a miner and official with the National Union of Mineworkers; Woof, who was 44, had been a member of Durham County Council since 1947. The Conservative Party candidate was John Reay-Smith, a 40-year-old solicitor who had been a member of Bishop Auckland Urban District Council and fought the constituency in the 1955 general election.

Results
Robert Woof won with a majority of 10,714, and went on to hold it for the next 23 years before retiring at the 1979 general election.

Votes

See also
 Blaydon (UK Parliament constituency)
 List of United Kingdom by-elections (1950-1979)

References

The Times House of Commons Supplement issued June 1957.

1956 elections in the United Kingdom
By-elections to the Parliament of the United Kingdom in County Durham constituencies
1956 in England
February 1956 events in the United Kingdom
Politics of Gateshead
Elections in Tyne and Wear
20th century in County Durham